2010–11 season of Argentine football is the 120th season of competitive football in Argentina.

National leagues

Men's

Primera División

Apertura champion: Estudiantes de La Plata (5th title)
Top scorer: Santiago Silva, Denis Stracqualursi (11 goals each)
Clausura champion: Vélez Sársfield (8th title)
Top scorer: Javier Cámpora, Teófilo Gutiérrez (11 goals each)
International qualifiers:
2011 Copa Libertadores: Estudiantes de La Plata, Vélez Sársfield, Godoy Cruz, Argentinos Juniors, Independiente
2012 Copa Libertadores:  Vélez Sársfield
2011 Copa Sudamericana: Independiente, Vélez Sársfield, Estudiantes de La Plata, Godoy Cruz, Lanús, Arsenal, Argentinos Juniors
Relegated:  Gimnasia (La Plata), Huracán, Quilmes, River Plate
Source: RSSSF

Primera B Nacional

Champion: Atlético de Rafaela (2nd title)
Top scorer: César Carignano (21 goals)
Promoted: Atlético de Rafaela, Unión de Santa Fe, San Martín de San Juan, Belgrano
Relegated: C.A.I., Tiro Federal, San Martín (Tucumán)
Source: RSSSF

Primera B Metropolitana

Champion: Atlanta (2nd title)
Top scorer: Leonardo Romero, Javier Grbec (19 goals each)
Promoted: Atlanta
Relegated: Deportivo Español
Source: RSSSF

Torneo Argentino A
Champion: Guillermo Brown (1st title)
Top scorer: Gonzalo Klusener
Promoted: Guillermo Brown and Desamparados
Relegated: Villa Mitre, 9 de Julio (Rafaela) and Estudiantes (Río Cuarto)
Source: RSSSF

Primera C Metropolitana

Champion: General Lamadrid
Top scorer: Ezequiel Petrovelli (20 goals)
Promoted: General Lamadrid
Relegated: Fénix
Source: RSSSF

Torneo Argentino B
Promoted: Gimnasia y Tiro and Racing de Olavarría
Relegated: Independiente de Neuquén, Juventud de Pergamino, Argentino de 25 de Mayo and Atlético Famaillá
Source: RSSSF

Primera D Metropolitana

Champion: Dock Sud
Top scorer: Lionel Fonzalida (22 goals)
Promoted: Dock Sud
Relegated: Puerto Nuevo
Source: RSSSF

Torneo Argentino C
Promoted: Huracán Las Heras, Once Tigres, General San Martín de Formosa and Jorge Newbery de Venado Tuerto
Source:

Women's

Campeonato de Fútbol Femenino
Apertura champion: Boca Juniors (18th title).
Clausura champion: Boca Juniors (19th title).
International qualifier:
2011 Copa Libertadores de Fútbol Femenino: Boca Juniors.
Source: RSSSF

Clubs in international competitions

Men's summary

Argentinos Juniors
2010 Copa Sudamericana

Argentinos Juniors eliminated by Independiente on points 1–4.

2011 Copa Libertadores
 

Argentinos Juniors eliminated by finishing in 4th place in their group.

Banfield
2010 Copa Sudamericana

Banfield eliminated by Deportes Tolima on goal difference 2–3.

Estudiantes de La Plata
2010 Recopa Sudamericana

Estudiantes de La Plata defeated by LDU Quito on points 1–4.

2010 Copa Sudamericana

Estudiantes de La Plata eliminated by Newell's Old Boys on points 1–4.

2011 Copa Libertadores

Estudiantes de La Plata eliminated by Cerro Porteño on penalties.

Godoy Cruz
2011 Copa Libertadores
 
 
 
 
 

Godoy Cruz eliminated by finishing in 4th place in their group.

Independiente
2010 Copa Sudamericana
 
 
 
 
 
 
 
 
 
 
Independiente defeated Goiás on penalties and won their first Copa Sudamericana.

2011 Copa Libertadores
 
 

 
 
 

Independiente eliminated by finishing in 3rd place in their group.

Newell's Old Boys
2010 Copa Sudamericana

Newell's Old Boys eliminated by LDU Quito on points 1–4.

Vélez Sársfield
2010 Copa Sudamericana

Vélez Sársfield eliminated by Banfield on points 1–4.

2011 Copa Libertadores

Vélez Sársfield eliminated by Peñarol on away goals.

Women's summary

Boca Juniors
2010 Copa Libertadores de Fútbol Femenino

Boca Juniors defeated Deportivo Quito and finished in third place.

National teams

Men's
This section covers Argentina men's matches from August 1, 2010 to July 31, 2011.

Friendly matches

2011 Copa América

Women's
This section covers Argentina women's matches from August 1, 2010 to July 31, 2011.

2010 Sudamericano Femenino

References

External links
AFA
Argentina on FIFA.com
Soloascenso.com.ar
RSSSF

 
Seasons in Argentine football